Carshalton Boys Sports College (formerly Carshalton High School for Boys) is an academy school that educates around 1200 boys aged 11–19 years old. It is situated on the southern edge of the St Helier local authority Housing Estate within the boundaries of Carshalton, London Borough of Sutton, England. In September 2003, the school was designated as a specialist sports college. As of 2011, the school has converted to academy status, but continues to have sport as a specialism. GCSE results have consistently been increasingly dramatically since 2009, although still below the national average. In addition, the school is rated 'Good' by OFSTED.

Notable former pupils 

 Major-General Edward Robert Festing CB FRS (1839–1912), army officer, chemist, and first Director of the Science Museum, London
 Alex Stepney, Manchester United and England goalkeeper, 1968 European Cup Winner
 Neal Ardley, Wimbledon FC Player and AFC Wimbledon Manager
 Elliot Colburn, Member of Parliament for Carshalton and Wallington since 2019.
Luke Richardson, Green Party activist in Brighton
Dylan Adjei-Hersey, professional footballer for AFC Wimbledon.
George Merrick (rugby union), professional rugby union player for US Carcassonne.

See also 
 Carshalton High School for Girls
 List of schools in Sutton

References

External links 
 
 Report by Ofsted

Boys' schools in London
Academies in the London Borough of Sutton
Secondary schools in the London Borough of Sutton
Carshalton
Sport schools in the United Kingdom
Specialist sports colleges in England